The Akaflieg Braunschweig SB-8 is an experimental, single-seat, high performance glider built in Germany in the 1960s, constructed largely from glass fibre skin over built up balsa wood structure. Two were built; the second of which was later fitted with a high aspect ratio (30:1) wing, becoming the Akaflieg Braunschweig SB-9 Stratus.

Design and development
The Akaflieg Braunschweig or Akademische Fliegergruppe Braunschweig is one of some fourteen German undergraduate student flying groups sponsored by their home technical university. Several have designed and built aircraft, often technically advanced and leading the development of gliders in particular. The Brunswick students had been exploring the use of GRP in a series of related gliders, beginning with the SB-6. From the SB-8 to the SB-10, wingspan and aspect ratio were progressively increased. Aspect ratio was increased from 23 to 36.6, resulting in aeroelastic problems.

SB-8
The SB-8 is similar to the SB-7, which also had an aspect ratio of 23. It performed well but had difficult handling characteristics, attributed to its Eppler aerofoil section. The SB-8 has an  wingspan, a two-piece wing of Wortmann FX 62 profile with an unswept leading edge, a slightly tapered centre section, and more strongly tapered outer sections. It is built around a box beam, with balsa ribs and a torsion shell of glass fibre laid over balsa.  The wing is shoulder mounted at 1.5° dihedral, with Schempp-Hirth airbrakes at mid-chord midway along the center section and ailerons on the outer panels. Both SB-8 built have camber flaps on the inboard wing panel and ailerons which are coupled to the flaps (flaperons) on the outboard panels.

The fuselage of the SB-8 is built with a fibreglass skin, over a balsa shell, with balsa vertical frames and two pine plywood main formers in the region between the wings. The nose is pointed and slightly drooped, with a short, single piece,  canopy just ahead of the wings, tapering gently aft to a straight tapered balsa/GRP T-tail unit.  The tailplane carries a conventional single piece elevator and the rudder is fabric covered.  On the ground the SB-8 is supported by  a retractable, unsprung monowheel undercarriage, assisted by a tail bumper.

The low wing loading also limited its smooth air cross country speed as there was no provision for ballast. Later, removable steel tubes filled with lead pellets were added to the wing roots of the SB-8 V1 to increase wing loading.

SB-9 Stratus
The SB-8 V2 had shown that glass-fibre wings could be made stiff enough to avoid aeroelastic flutter problems and that the higher aspect ratio produced the expected improvement in glide angle. It was natural for the next Akaflieg Braunschweig design to have a wing of greater span, replacing the wing of the SB-8 V2 airframe with a four-panel wing of similar construction but  span. At the time of its first flight in January 1969 the SB-9 had probably the greatest span of any glider then flying, though the -span Holighaus Nimbus 1 flew only three days later. The new wing took advantage of the flexibility of glass fibre to implement elastic flaps. The intention was to avoid the interruption to the wing profile at the hinge, particularly on the critical upper surface, and leakage through it by bending the upper surface instead. This method had been used earlier in the wooden-winged HKS-1 glider of 1953.

Operational history
Both SB-8s competed at the German National Championships of 1968, Wolfgang Beduhn finishing fifth in the V1 and Helmut Treiber seventh in the V2. The V2 went on to become the SB-9, but the V1 remained in regular use at Brunswick until 1989. It remained airworthy after that, though flown less often, and was still on the German Civil Aircraft register in 2010.

The SB-9 was used by the Akaflieg students in competitions between 1969 and 1971. It also gave them the opportunity to film and study the alarming motions of the wing when fluttering, recording their observations on film in slow motion and in the air. The fundamental mode was seen, at a frequency of 3.3 Hz but at  the wing oscillated at 5.8 Hz in a second harmonic mode. During these largely vertical excursions, the wing also twisted and its overall motion excited vibrations in the rear fuselage and tail unit.

The career of the SB-9 ended in 1972, when it was decided to use its wing on the SB-10 two-seater, a new design with a very different fuselage and the span increased still further with an 8.7 m (28t ft 7 in) centre section.

Variants
Data from Sailplanes 1965-2000 unless excepted.
Provision for water ballast, maximum permitted speed increased to 
SB-9 Stratus The SB-8V2 modified with a four-part wing of  span, fitted with elastic flaps. SB-9 Stratus was first flown January 1969. It is Empty weight, maximum in flight weight, ballasted, .

Specifications (SB-8 V2 & SB-9)

References

1960s German sailplanes
1960s German experimental aircraft
Akaflieg Braunschweig aircraft
Aircraft first flown in 1967
Shoulder-wing aircraft